Scopula relictata is a moth of the  family Geometridae. It is found in Kenya, Senegal, the United Arab Emirates, Australia, India, Sri Lanka and Taiwan.

References

Moths described in 1866
relictata
Moths of Africa
Moths of Asia
Moths of Australia